Semilaoma is a genus of three pinhead or dot snail species that are endemic to Australia's Lord Howe Island in the Tasman Sea.

Species
 Semilaoma costata Shea & Griffiths, 2010 – coarse-ribbed pinhead snail
 Semilaoma laevis Shea & Griffiths, 2010 – smooth pinhead snail
 Semilaoma lidgbirdensis (Iredale, 1944) – Mount Lidgbird pinhead snail

References

 
 

 
 
Gastropod genera
Taxa named by Tom Iredale
Gastropods described in 1944
Gastropods of Lord Howe Island